The Oahu akialoa (Akialoa ellisana) was a Hawaiian honeycreeper in the subfamily Carduelinae of the family Fringillidae (finches). It was formerly considered a subspecies in the greater akialoa complex before being elevated to a full species. It was endemic to the island of Oahu in the Hawaiian Islands.

Description

The bird was a long-billed insectivorous bird that was found in the high elevation forest. It was a dull colored species, dull green on the belly, bright green on rump and tail, dark olive-gray back and speckled yellow and green on the head.  It was mainly an insectivore, using its bill to probe through the bark in search of arthropods, also using its long bill to probe flowers for nectar.

Status
Since the population was already taking a toll due to the large amount of deforestation, it was susceptible to the avian influenza, more commonly known as the bird flu. This was brought in by mosquitoes who were carrying the virus and were able to spread it within the community. Because of the virus, the population fell to around 4–6 percent of its normal population (Pratt). Scientists were sure that this bird was still common in the 1860s, according to evidence found by Perkins. Afterward, few reports came in, though two were presumed to be seen in 1933 and one in 1940.

References

2: H. D. and T. Pratt. “The interplay of species concepts, taxonomy, and conservation: lessons from the Hawaiian avifauna.” Studies in avian biology 22 (2001): 68–80.

External links
 3D view of specimens RMNH 110.021, RMNH 110.022 and RMNH 110.023 at Naturalis, Leiden (requires QuickTime browser plugin)

Oahu
Oahu akialoa
Extinct birds of Hawaii
Endemic birds of Hawaii
Bird extinctions since 1500
Oahu akialoa
Species made extinct by human activities
Taxa named by George Robert Gray
Taxonomy articles created by Polbot